Brooksville, Alabama may refer to:
Brooksville, Blount County, Alabama
Brooksville, Morgan County, Alabama